Maravich is a surname of Serbian origin.

Notable people with the surname include:

 Pete Maravich, American basketball player
 Press Maravich, American basketball player and coach

See also
 Maravić

Serbian surnames